Ergis may refer to:

Ergis (company), or Ergis Spółka Akcyjna, Polish chemical company that processes plastics and manufactures PVC, PET and PE products
Ergis Mersini (born 1988), Albanian footballer

See also
Ergi (disambiguation)